Chilostoma is a genus of medium-sized, air-breathing land snails, terrestrial pulmonate gastropod mollusks in the family Helicidae, the true snails.

Subgenera and species 
Subgenera and species within the genus Chilostoma include:
 Chilostoma achates (Rossmässler, 1835)
 Chilostoma adelozona (Strobel, 1857)
 Chilostoma cingulatum (Studer, 1820)
 Chilostoma desmoulinsii (Farines, 1834): synonym of Corneola desmoulinsii (Farines, 1834)
 Chilostoma frigidum (De Cristofori & Jan, 1832)
 Chilostoma millieri (Bourguignat, 1880)
 Chilostoma squammatinum (Dupuy, 1848)
 Chilostoma tigrinum (De Cristofori & Jan, 1832)
 Chilostoma zonatum (Studer, 1820)

 subgenus Ariantopsis
Chilostoma pelia

 subgenus Campylaea Beck, 1837: synonym of Campylaea H. Beck, 1837
 Chilostoma illyricum (Stabile, 1864)
 Chilostoma planospira (Lamarck 1822): synonym of Campylaea planospira (Lamarck, 1822)
 Chilostoma planospira benedictum
 Chilostoma planospira macrostoma
 Chilostoma planospira occultatum
 Chilostoma planospira planospira
 Chilostoma planospira setulosum
 subgenus Cingulifera Held, 1838: synonym of Chilostoma Fitzinger, 1833

 subgenus Corneola
 Chilostoma acrotricha
 Chilostoma crombezi
 Chilostoma desmoulinsii
 Chilostoma squamatinum
 subgenus Delphinatia P. Hesse, 1931: raised to rank of genus Delphinatia P. Hesse, 1931
 Chilostoma glaciale (A. Férussac, 1832): synonym of Delphinatia glacialis (A. Férussac, 1832)
 Chilostoma alpinum (Michaud, 1831): synonym of Delphinatia fontenillii alpina (Michaud, 1831)
 subgenus Dinarica
 Chilostoma pouzolz]: synonym of Dinarica pouzolzii (Deshayes, 1832)
 Chilostoma serbica
 subgenus Josephinella
 Chilostoma apfelbecki
 Chilostoma argentellei
 Chilostoma brenskei
 Chilostoma byshekensis
 Chilostoma choristochila
 Chilostoma comythophora
 Chilostoma conemenosi
 Chilostoma edlaueri
 Chilostoma eliaca
 Chilostoma faueri
 Chilostoma fuchsi
 Chilostoma hemonica
 Chilostoma hirta
 Chilostoma krueperi
 Chilostoma lefeburiana
 Chilostoma moellendorffi
 Chilostoma phocaea
 Chilostoma sadleriana
 Chilostoma stenomphala
 Chilostoma subaii
 Chilostoma subzonata
 Chilostoma zebiana
 subgenus Kosicia Brusina, 1904: synonym of Kosicia Brusina, 1904
 Chilostoma intermedium (A. Férussac, 1832): synonym of Kosicia intermedia (C. Pfeiffer, 1828)
 Chilostoma ziegleri (Rossmässler, 1836): synonym of Kosicia ziegleri (Rossmässler, 1836)
 subgenus Wladislawia: synonym of Campylaea (Wladislawia) A. J. Wagner, 1928
 ...
 subgenus Faustina Kobelt, 1904: synonym of Faustina Kobelt, 1904
 Chilostoma cingulella (Rossmässler, 1837): synonym of Faustina cingulella (Rossmässler, 1837)
 Chilostoma rossmaessleri (L. Pfeiffer, 1842): synonym of Faustina rossmaessleri (L. Pfeiffer, 1842)
 Chilostoma faustina (Rossmässler, 1835) - synonym: Faustina faustina (Rossmässler, 1835)
 subgenus Drobacia Brusina, 1904
 Chilostoma banaticum (Rossmässler, 1838), see under Drobacia banatica

References 

 Groenenberg D.S.J., Subai P. & Gittenberger E. (2016). Systematics of Ariantinae (Gastropoda, Pulmonata, Helicidae), a new approach to an old problem. Contributions to Zoology. 85(1): 37-65

External links
 Fitzinger, L.J. (1833). Systematisches Verzeichniß der im Erzherzogthume Oesterreich vorkommenden Weichthiere, als Prodrom einer Fauna derselben. Beiträge zur Landeskunde Oesterreichs's unter der Enns, 3: 88-122. Wien

 
Helicidae
Gastropod genera
Taxonomy articles created by Polbot